Finn Andersen (born 14 April 1990), better known as karrigan, is a Danish professional Counter-Strike: Global Offensive player and captain for FaZe Clan. He has also played for other teams including Fnatic, Team Dignitas, Team SoloMid, Astralis, Mousesports and Team Envy. Andersen was a founding member of Astralis, a player-owned team established in 2015. He began playing competitively in 2006 during the Counter-Strike 1.6 era.

Early and personal life
Karrigan's brother started playing Counter-Strike around 2001 and soon afterwards he was introduced to the game. Karrigan was playing competitively by 2006 and 2007 and on November 5, 2010, he joined Full-Gaming, whose teammates included Michael “Friis” Jørgensen and Timm “ArcadioN” Henriksen.

In 2015 he finished a Master's Degree in business administration and auditing from Copenhagen Business School. He currently resides in Aarhus.

Career
Karrigan joined fnatic around March 25, 2012 and the team won many tournaments that year. With the advent of Counter-Strike: Global Offensive scene he joined mousesports because "the offer they gave me was really good", and he felt like the Fnatic lineup did not have what it took to be successful in the new title.

Karrigan left Copenhagen Wolves and joined the Denmark-based roster of North American organization Team SoloMid.

On January 25, 2015, Team SoloMid picked up Team Dignitas' CS roster. In July SoloMid placed 3-4th the year's second Major, ESL One Cologne 2015. In October TSM got 5-8th at the last Major, DreamHack Open Cluj-Napoca 2015.

TSM's CS:GO roster left the organization on December 3, 2015, amid internal troubles. For the next few tournaments the team competed under the name "Team Question Mark". On January 9, 2016, Team Question Mark unveiled the new organization they created, Astralis, because of a desire to have a "stable environment" in eSports. The organization was registered as an Anpartsselskab (ApS) and received venture capital from Sunstone Capital, and is angel invested by entrepreneur Tommy Ahlers.

On June 5, 2016, he was denied entry into the United States to compete in the group stage of ELeague Season 1 due to new rules regarding Electronic System for Travel Authorization (ESTA) travel because he had been to Iran within the last five years. During the matches he missed the team used coach Danny "Zonic" Sørensen in his place. Astralis got 3-4th at the MLG Major Championship: Columbus in March. In July they got 5-8th at second Major, ESL One Cologne 2016.

Karrigan transferred to FaZe Clan on October 19, 2016.

After leaving FaZe Clan in 2019 to join Mousesports with mixed results he transferred back to FaZe Clan as a free agent when his Mousesports contract expired in February 2021.

Karrigan won his first CS:GO Major at that age of 32 during the PGL Major Antwerp 2022, becoming the oldest player to do so.

References

External links
 

Danish esports players
Counter-Strike players
Astralis players
Team SoloMid players
Dignitas (esports) players
Mousesports players
FaZe Clan players
Fnatic players
Living people
People from Aarhus
People from Copenhagen
Copenhagen Business School alumni
Danish people of German descent
1990 births